Maitiú is an Irish form of Matthew, a male given name of biblical origin.

See also
Matha
Matthew
Feis Maitiú Corcaigh

References

Irish-language masculine given names